Ouagadougou attack may refer to:

 2016 Ouagadougou attacks, 15 January
 2017 Ouagadougou attack, 13 August
 2018 Ouagadougou attacks, 2 March